Propaganda is a form of persuasion that is often used in media to further some sort of agenda, such as a personal, political, or business agenda, by evoking an emotional or obligable response from the audience. It includes the deliberate sharing of realities, views, and philosophies intended to alter behavior and stimulate people to act.

To explain the close associations between media and propaganda, Richard Alan Nelson observed propaganda as a form of persuasion with intention with the aid of controlled transmission of single-sided information through mass media. Mass media and propaganda are inseparable.

Mass media, as a system for spreading and relaying information and messages to the public, plays a role in amusing, entertaining and informing individuals with rules and values that situate them in social structure. Therefore, propaganda creates conflicts among society's differing classes. Nowadays, in a media engulfed society, mass media is the main platform and output for carrying out acts of propaganda and for pushing forward agendas.

Today, various amounts of modern media can be used to supply propaganda to its intended audience such as, radio, television, films posters handouts music smartphones, just to name a few.

Origins 

"Propaganda" was a term that was commonly used in 1914, the beginning of the World War, though its origin can be traced back to the ancient Greece. In Athens, the original place of western civilization as well as the centre of northern mediterranean culture, the citizen class was conscious and well informed of their interests and public affairs. Thus, conflicts and divergence on individual interests and other religious matters demanded propaganda. Without the modern mass media sources such as newspaper, radio and televisions functioning as a medium for information spreading, a series of alternatives can play a role for propagandizing values and beliefs to shape and mold the opinions of men. These can include dramas, games and religious festivals. Additionally, another tool for propaganda in an oral-biased society is articulation.

Propaganda today is endowed with negative connotative meanings in a political context, despite that the word entered language with religious origins. Pope Gregory XV established an institution for spreading the faith and addressing a series of church affairs, which is namely the Congregation for the Propagation of the Faith. Further, a College of Propaganda was set up under Pope Urban VIII to train priests for missions.

Throughout the historical stages, propaganda has always been evident in momentum social movements such as American independence, the French Revolution, and especially during wartimes. Wartime propaganda is often demanded for shaping public opinions to gain more allies on an international level, as well as calling for citizens to make a contribution and sacrifice to the war on a domestic level. Propaganda was used in the media when the thirteen colonies were trying to separate from Britain. One example from this time period, is the Boston Massacre. After this event, the colonist began putting forms of propaganda into the newspapers in an attempt to get more people to rebel against the British. Governments during the First World War devoted massive resources and huge amounts of effort to producing material designed to shape opinion and action internationally. As Clark claimed, posters in wartime with some visual codes are powerful tools to make people adapt to the new conditions and norms arising from the wars and to accommodate the needs of the war. During the Second World War, the power of propaganda came to the extreme, under the horrors of Nazi Germany. And since then, the word carries more negative connotations than neutral.

Nowadays, the term is used in journalism, advertising, and education mostly in a political context. In non-democratic countries, propaganda continues to flourish as a means for indoctrinating citizens, and this practice is unlikely to cease in the future.

In its origins, "propaganda" is an ancient and honorable word.

Social media  
Social media have become powerful tools for propaganda as the Internet is unprecedentedly accessible for each individual, and interactive social networking sites provide a strong platform for debate and sharing opinions. Propaganda, in forms of a video uploaded to YouTube, a post on Facebook or Twitter, or even a piece of comment, has far-reaching effectiveness to disseminate certain values and beliefs.

Another element that makes social media effective for sharing propaganda is that it can reach many people with little effort and users can filter the content to remove content they do not want while retaining what they would like to see. This ease of use can be used by ordinary people as well as government agencies and politicians, who can take advantage of the platforms to spread "junk" news in favor of their cause.

Research  
In 2017 the University of Oxford launched the Computational Propaganda Research Project, a series of studies researching how social media are globally used to manipulate public opinion. The study, which used interviews and "tens of millions posts on seven different social media platforms during scores of elections, political crises, and national security incidents", found that in Russia, approximately 45% of Twitter accounts are bots and in Taiwan, a campaign against President Tsai Ing-wen involved thousands of accounts being heavily coordinated and sharing Chinese propaganda.

Techniques to like, share, and post on social networks were used. The bot accounts were used to "game algorithms" to push different content on the platforms. Real content put out by real people can be covered up and bots can make online measures of support, such as the number of likes or retweets something has received, look larger than it should, thus tricking users into thinking that specific piece of content is popular, a process identified as manufacturing consensus.

YouTube  
YouTube has over 1 billion users each month. This means that many people will likely have a chance to see videos posted by others. With this being such a huge place for propaganda to thrive, terrorist groups like ISIS try to get their videos on YouTube for millions to see. They often post videos of them helping out civilians or kids. Their videos show them being nice to try and change people's opinion about them. However, they also post videos to strike fear into others and to persuade them to join their cause. Fearing their own people will be swayed to join groups like ISIS, ISIS post videos to appeal to extremists: "they make these videos in a way to entice people who are vulnerable to extremist ways."

As it is reported in New York Times,  "A propaganda video is released by North Korea on YouTube mainly depicting a United States aircraft carrier and a warplane being destroyed in computer-generated balls of fire, the latest salvo in an escalating war of words between the two. The video released by a state media outlet is narrated by a woman and including images of North Korea’s military. According to the video, North Korea’s missiles will be "stabbed into the throat of the carrier," and the jet will "fall from the sky," it warns."

Twitter

Russia  
During the 2016 presidential election, 200,000 tweets deemed as "malicious activity" from Russia-linked accounts were outed on Twitter. The accounts pushed hundreds of thousands of these tweets claiming that Democrats were practicing witchcraft and posed as Black Lives Matter activists. Investigators were able to trace the account to a Kremlin-linked propaganda outfit. It was founded in 2013 and known as the Internet Research Agency (IRA).

Saudi Arabia  
The New York Times reported in late October 2018 that Saudi Arabia used an online army of Twitter trolls.

Terrorism  
"Using little-known content uploading services, anonymous text-pasting sites and multiple backup Twitter accounts, a select group of ISIS operatives managed to evade administrators' controls to spread the Cantlie video, titled Lend Me Your Ears, around the web within a few hours."

In another example of propaganda, Abdulrahman, the operator al-Hamid used the techniques of hashtagging in a Twitter post to gain the heat of the topics to disseminate the information. A great deal of followers of Hamid on Twitter were demanded to find the highest trending topics in the UK and popular account names they could jump on to get the largest possible reach. As @Abu_Laila wrote: "We need those who can supply us with the most active hashtags in the UK. And also the accounts of the most famous celebrities. I believe that the hashtag of Scotland's separation from Britain should be the first."

College recruiting  
College coaches are now using Twitter as a way of drawing in new recruits. Since most college coaches have a plethora of followers, they can use their platform to help a recruit and get attention by posting about him/her. This approach is most commonly used on football players because if a coach posts about them it makes them feel wanted and respected. One example of how coaches use Twitter to recruit would be taking a photo of the recruit playing football and photo shop it to make it look like the recruit is wearing the uniform of that particular college and then posting it to their Twitter. This gives the fan base a chance to react and praise the athlete which is essential because a recruit might make his college decision based on what school and fan base shows the most love. Recruits can also use their Twitter as a platform to help get them noticed by college coaches. An athlete can showcase his talent to the world by posting his highlight tape and simply waiting for a coach to see it. Players must be careful about the content that they post however, because in today's world coaches will not offer a scholarship to anyone who has anything bad on their account.

Facebook  
Facebook has made huge impact on society by allowing thousands of people to communicate with their family and friends, and be able to keep up-to-date with the rest of the world. But the usage of Facebook leads to the activity of propaganda online. For example, the Facebook pages of Syrian President Bashar al-Assad and the National Coalition of Syrian Revolution and Opposition Forces in 2013 and 2014, uses images to promote their agendas relating to politics during the conflicts following 2011 uprisings in Syria. Their government uses visual frames to help support the image that President Assad is a "fearless leader protecting its people and that life has continued normally through Syria," and to help strengthen the images of the violence and sufferings of the civilians caused by the Assad regime.

There is also research that "cloaked" Facebook accounts are behind the creation of spreading political propaganda online to "imitate the identity of an opponent so they can spark hateful and aggressive reactions" from the media and the opponent. The process goes after a case study on a Danish Facebook pages that are cloaking their pages to resemble radical Islamist pages to help "[provoke] racist and anti-Muslim reactions as well as negative sentiments towards refugees and immigrants in Denmark." The research founded on the pages analyzes the challenges of propaganda online, such as epistemological, methodological and conceptual challenges. The information also adds to the reader's "understanding of disinformation and propaganda in an increasingly interactive social media environment and contributes to a critical inquiry into social media and subversive politics."

United States  
In October 2018, The Daily Telegraph reported that Facebook "banned hundreds of pages and accounts which it says were fraudulently flooding its site with partisan political content – although they came from the US instead of being associated with Russia."

Music  
Music has always played a major role in popular culture.  Political ideology is often spread through media; however, the use of music reaches an extremely wide and varying audience.  The point of propaganda, according to Manzaria and Bruck, is to “Persuade people’s attitude, beliefs, and behaviors”. Music of all genres is constantly being used to portray a political view, shed light, or bring validity to a subject the author, or artist, feels is worth venturing.  Propaganda through modes like advertisement and campaign, while effective, will only reach a small group of the desired recipients.

A form of music that focuses the most on propaganda is the patriotic and war music from any one country. With songs like "Slavic Woman's Farewell", "Over There", "God Bless the USA", " Fortunate Son", and Jimi Hendrix's cover of the American national anthem, these songs are designed to provoke an emotion of either respect and patriotism for your country, or rebellion and disgust at your country's actions. To quote the Chicago Tribune, patriotic songs are designed to, "make us feel good about our country even when our country does something we believe is wrong."

According to Putman, musical propaganda has a great deal to do with the audience. Each musical genre can reach a specific demographic within a few minutes, along with the propaganda intertwined. Purfleau brings a more social view to the concept of politically motivated music, stating that musical propaganda is "the basis for a certain kind of political art that aspires to contest the contemporary economic and social order". Purfleau's approach to understanding musical propaganda explains the timeless manner by which music has been used to portray viewpoints. Though music is not always the first media thought of when contemplating propaganda, it is an extremely effective mode and has proved to influence popular culture throughout human history.

Manufactured consent 
Edward S. Herman's and Noam Chomsky's book titled “Manufacturing Consent” tackles this notion as Chomsky uses the analogy of a media machine that divide methods used by media into five different filters, including how media works through ownership, advertising, media-elite, flack and an agreed upon common enemy.

The relationship between viewer and broadcaster- consumer and producer in the context of media, has been explored since the beginning of mass communication. This has been carried out not only arguing how the invention of the television changed the make-up of households, but also how news outlets and the Internet have become powerful tools in pushing propaganda and selected information on consumers. Manufactured spaces in media create "information bubbles" through mechanisms such as algorithmic capitalism. They seek to control the ideologies of consumers by bombarding them with information that is leaning to one side whilst depriving them of objectivity. Mass media is selective and influential in its content shared to consumers.

Ownership looks at how people in power and those affected by information brought to the media seek to either destroy it or "spin" it around to maintain self-image and power. Media outlets need consumers to attract advertisers. These two filters are dependent on the media elite and flack to function due to the fact that the media elite are journalists and other people with access to platforms that are essentially hand picked due to the fact that they play by the rules set by the owners with regards to how and what information is shared. Flack on the other hand are those Chomsky proposes to be defamed by those in power or not even given access to a platform simply because their information is too critical or that it threatens ownership, advertisers and revenue in general. The use of having a common enemy is one most identified in politics and can be described as a scapegoat used to justify decisions made by people in power. Hence, the basic concept of Herman's and Chomsky's idea is that these filters illustrate how media can be selective about information and why they are motivated to do so.

With that said, the danger behind filtered information is highlighted in the sense that it creates “ideological polarization”- a phenomenon within a society that “has dominated both popular and academic debates” (Sphor 2017). A truly simplified example of this phenomenon would be the political system in the United States of America and the “self placement between…Democrats and Republicans” the key word in this context being self-placement, as society is grouped and divided into two schools of thoughts. This black and white fallacy is the backbone to the polarization effect observed in society's thinking.

Advertising

Emphasis and Repression in Advertising 
Media companies use advertising to advance propaganda. Studies have reported that organisations use advertising to promote economic propaganda by influencing how consumers perceive brands. Ideally, consumers need to have access to all the necessary information that is required to make purchase decisions. On the contrary, advertisements contain positive and exaggerated information that is intended to convince a consumer to buy a particular product. Many adverts are known to include phrases such as "50 percent stronger" or "Less than 30 percent fat,” which are highly emphasised. These statements mislead consumers who fail to take into account the shortcomings associated with products that are typically repressed in the advert while focusing on exaggerated features. Accordingly, this strategy amounts to propaganda since companies use it to cause consumers to make irrational decisions by intentional influencing.

Reference through Name Calling 
Name-calling has traditionally existed as a common technique in advertising, as it involves making statements that demean and undermine a competitor without necessarily being true. Common brand names such as Coca-Cola and Pepsi have been known to engage in name-calling. The two companies often come up with advertisements that undermine the products that the other offers. Similarly, Burger King ran an ad that featured its sandwich “The Whopper” being bigger than the box that McDonald's uses in packing its “Big Mac” hamburger. These examples underscore how companies have resorted to using name-calling in advertising rather than highlighting how their products would benefit the consumer. Consequently, these organisations manage to persuade and manipulate consumers into making purchase decisions based on misleading information.

Bandwagon 
Companies increasingly use the technique in advertising their products and services. This method seeks to convince a consumer to make a purchase decision out of the fear of being left out. Claiming that millions of consumers are using their products or services and that it would be a mistake not to be part of the trend. In 1994, McDonald's featured an advert that claimed that the fast-food company had served 99 billion customers since its inception. While such a claim may be valid, such information is not meant to allow a consumer to make a rational purchase decision. Instead, these statements are designed to cause people to buy products that they do not necessarily need for the mere reason of not being the one left out. Bandwagon propaganda has, therefore, become a central aspect of modern advertising.

Glittering Generality 
Another common propaganda technique that is often used in advertising is glittering generality. This approach involves using statements that contain phrases that the consumer would immediately consider valuable without further analysis. When used effectively, this strategy allows a company to use its adverts in appealing to consumers emotionally rather than helping them to make rational decisions. Some of the most common terms that are used in advertising to elicit immediate positive feelings among consumers include better and best. An advert may emphasise that the product is the best for the consumer without necessarily indicating the reason why and how the consumer would benefit from making the purchase. Since consumers want to acquire the best products and services, they choose to buy such items without analysing whether the claims are valid. The ability to trigger a positive reaction on the consumer forms the basis of glittering generality in advertising.

Transfer Propaganda 
Entailing advertisement to projecting positive or negative feelings that a person has regarding a specific idea or person to another. The goal of transfer propaganda in advertising is to cause the consumer to associate a product with positive or negative qualities such as patriotism and nationalism in their product evaluation. An advert that emphasizes patriotism, for instance, might be designed to cause consumers to buy a product out of the love that they have for their country. Companies take advantage of the fact that people value some things and that they detest others in shaping marketing campaigns.

Testimonial Advertising 
Advertisements across the world also contain aspects of testimonial propaganda. Notably, this strategy involves including influential people, as well as authority figures and experts, in adverts to attract the attention of consumers. A toothpaste advert that claims that 99 percent of dentists would recommend the product is an example of how testimonial propaganda occurs in advertising. Similarly, companies or campaigns are known to use celebrities in endorsing different products through both traditional and modern advertising channels. A billboard containing the picture of a famous footballer holding a ball could, for instance, create the impression that the celebrity prefers the specific brand. In such cases, companies may persuade and manipulate consumers into believing that their products have been tested and approved by authority figures. An understanding of how testimonial advertising affects consumers is, therefore, helpful in assessing why companies use it.

See also 
 Brian Timpone
 History of propaganda
 Media bias
 Media manipulation
 Political music
 Propaganda techniques

Further reading 
 Jacques Ellul, Propaganda: The Formation of Men's Attitudes. Trans. Konrad Kellen & Jean Lerner. New York: Knopf, 1965. New York: Random House/ Vintage 1973
 The Techniques of Propaganda
 Defining Propaganda II
 Media's Use of Propaganda to Persuade People's Attitude, Beliefs and Behaviors
 The Computational Propaganda Project at the Oxford Internet Institute, University of Oxford

References 

Social phenomena
Media bias
Media manipulation
Propaganda